Count sketch  is a type of dimensionality reduction that is particularly efficient in statistics, machine learning and algorithms.
It was invented by 
Moses Charikar, Kevin Chen and Martin Farach-Colton in an effort to speed up the AMS Sketch by Alon, Matias and Szegedy for approximating the frequency moments of streams.

The sketch is nearly identical to the Feature hashing algorithm by John Moody, but differs in its use of hash functions with low dependence, which makes it more practical.
In order to still have a high probability of success, the median trick is used to aggregate multiple count sketches, rather than the mean.

These properties allow use for explicit kernel methods, bilinear pooling in neural networks and is a cornerstone in many numerical linear algebra algorithms.

Mathematical definition

1.
 and  such that
 and
.

2. For each item  in the stream, add  to the th bucket of the th hash.

At the end of this process, one has  sums  where

To estimate the count of s one computes the following value:

The values  are unbiased estimates of how many times  has appeared in the stream.

The estimate  has variance , where

Vector formulation
Alternatively Count-Sketch can be seen as a linear mapping with a non-linear reconstruction function.
Let , be a collection of  matrices, defined by

To reconstruct  we take .

Relation to Tensor sketch

The count sketch projection of the outer product of two vectors is equivalent to the convolution of two component count sketches. 

The count sketch computes a vector convolution 

Pham and Pagh  show that this equals  – a count sketch  of the outer product of vectors, where  denotes Kronecker product.

The fast Fourier transform can be used to do fast convolution of count sketches.
By using the face-splitting product such structures can be  computed much faster than normal matrices.

See also 
 Count–min sketch
 Tensorsketch

References

Further reading

Faisal M. Algashaam; Kien Nguyen; Mohamed Alkanhal; Vinod Chandran; Wageeh Boles. "Multispectral Periocular Classification WithMultimodal Compact Multi-Linear Pooling" . IEEE Access, Vol. 5. 2017.

Dimension reduction